Munroe Lake is a lake in northern Manitoba near the provincial boundary with Nunavut, Canada.

Lakes of Manitoba